The Gaznata is a river of Spain located in the centre of the Iberian Peninsula, a left-bank tributary of the Alberche.

Flowing southwards along a total length of 27.20 km, it empties in the Alberche, specifically into El Burguillo Reservoir, draining a catchment area of 164.20 km2.

The name Gaznata has been proposed to have a Berber origin, tentatively identified as "Wād-al-Zanāta", Zanāta referring to the Zenata berber tribe.

References 

 Citations

 Bibliography
 
 
 

Tributaries of the Alberche
Rivers of Castile and León
Tagus basin